Thorsø is a village, with a population of 1,751 (1 January 2022), located in Favrskov Municipality of  the Central Denmark Region in the Jutland peninsula of Denmark.

References

Towns and settlements in Favrskov Municipality